House of Binary is the third album by The Wisdom of Harry, an experimental electronic music ensemble from London.

Track listing

 "...Hello" (0:41)
 "Unit One" (3:28)
 "Coney Island of Your Mind" (4:33)
 "Caesar Boots" (4:22)
 "March of the Otaku" (3:11)
 "Theme from Eggboy" (1:37)
 "Boxed" (4:31)
 "Disco C" (4:05)
 "Woke up Buzzing" (3:24)
 "Sleepwalking" (3:37)
 "The Year Without Speaking" (1:36)
 "I'm Going to Make my Life Right" (3:34)
 "Palefinger" (3:07)
 "The Wisdom" (4:57)

2000 albums
Matador Records albums